Oakwood Academy may refer to:

The Oakwood Academy,  a secondary school in Nottingham, Nottinghamshire, England
Oakwood Adventist Academy,  a Seventh-day Adventist school in  Huntsville, Alabama, United States

See also
Oakwood (disambiguation)
Oakwood School (disambiguation)